45 RPM is the debut album by Paul van Dyk. It was released in Germany on the MFS label on  December 5, 1994. It was then released on Deviant Records in the UK and Mute Records in the US in 1998.

Initial copies of the German album came with a bonus disc of remixes Van Dyk had done for other artists called 45 Remixes Per Minute. Among the artists featured on this disc were New Order and Inspiral Carpets.

Track listings

References

External links 
 45 RPM at Discogs

1994 debut albums
Deviant Records albums
Mute Records albums
Paul van Dyk albums